John Groves Gould (April 20, 1912 – February 7, 2002) was a Canadian lawyer and political figure in British Columbia. He represented Vancouver-Burrard in the Legislative Assembly of British Columbia as a Liberal from 1949 to 1952.

He was born in Vancouver, British Columbia, the son of John Gould, a native of England, and Clara Groves. Groves served as a lieutenant with the Royal Canadian Navy in the North Atlantic and Mediterranean during World War II. He served as a member of a Liberal-Conservative coalition in the provincial assembly. Groves was defeated when he ran for reelection in 1952 and 1953.

He died in 2002 after a brief illness.

References 

1912 births
2002 deaths
British Columbia Liberal Party MLAs
Canadian military personnel of World War II
Politicians from Vancouver
Royal Canadian Navy officers
Canadian people of English descent